The DS 7 Crossback, now known as simply the DS 7, is a compact luxury crossover SUV from the French automaker DS Automobiles. The vehicle was presented for the first time on 28 February 2017, and its public premiere was at the 87th Geneva Motor Show in March 2017.

The DS7, like the Citroën C5 Aircross, is based on the EMP2 platform of Groupe PSA. Though not the first SUV for and from the brand (see DS 6), it is the first SUV for Europe.

Overview

The DS7 was revealed to the press on 28 February 2017, before being shown to the public at the 2017 Geneva Motor Show and marketed in January 2018 for diesel versions.

Positioning
With the DS 5 in 2011 being the last new model launched by DS Automobiles in Europe, its overall sales have been affected, falling in recent years.

As well as improving sales, the DS 7 Crossback was more comfortable, with build quality and technologies (driving aids, semi-autonomous driving) also improved.

DS7 Crossback Presidential

On his inauguration on 14 May 2017, the elected president Emmanuel Macron chose the DS 7 Crossback as his presidential car. This was the first time a president used an SUV model as part of an inauguration ceremony. It was only used once for this occasion and was later exhibited in the showroom DS World Paris.

This specific version (lent seven months before the model is sold in France, scheduled for January 2018) is in an ink blue color and has a custom-made made, uncovered roof. French flags and logos "RF" (for "République Française" (or "[the] French Republic" in French)) appear in various places, the interiors a black leather, and a "lacquer canvas" (a fabric coated with lacquer) has been specially made by the Maury workshop.

On the occasion of the European Heritage Days on 16 and 17 September 2017, the DS 7 Crossback Présidentiel was exhibited in the courtyard of the Palais de l'Elysée.

Esprit de Voyage
Introduced in March 2023, the "Esprit de Voyage" special edition, French for "spirit of travel", is the flagship trim level for the DS 4 and DS 7 and features new materials and color combinations inspired by the fashion industry.

Gallery

Notes

References

2010s cars
DS vehicles
Cars introduced in 2017
Crossover sport utility vehicles
Luxury crossover sport utility vehicles
Plug-in hybrid vehicles
Partial zero-emissions vehicles
Hybrid sport utility vehicles
All-wheel-drive vehicles
2020s cars